The sixth season of Chicago P.D., an American police drama television series with executive producer Dick Wolf, and producers Derek Haas, Michael Brandt, and Rick Eid, was ordered on May 9, 2018. The season premiered on September 26, 2018. The season concluded on May 22, 2019, and contained 22 episodes. This is the last season where Jon Seda plays Antonio Dawson.

Cast

Regular
 Jason Beghe as Sergeant Henry "Hank" Voight
 Jon Seda as Detective Antonio Dawson
 Jesse Lee Soffer as Detective Jay Halstead
 Tracy Spiridakos as Detective Hailey Upton
 Patrick John Flueger as Officer Adam Ruzek
 Marina Squerciati as Officer Kim Burgess
 LaRoyce Hawkins as Officer Kevin Atwater
 Amy Morton as Desk Sergeant Trudy Platt

Recurring
 Anne Heche as Deputy Superintendent Katherine Brennan
 John C. McGinley as Superintendent Brian Kelton
 Wendell Pierce as Alderman Ray Price
 Charles Michael Davis as Blair Williams

Special guest star
 Rob Morrow as Evan Gilchrist

Crossover characters
 Jesse Spencer as Captain Matthew Casey
 Taylor Kinney as Lieutenant Kelly Severide
 Kara Killmer as Paramedic in Charge Sylvie Brett
 David Eigenberg as Lieutenant Christopher Herrmann
 Joe Minoso as Firefighter Joe Cruz
 Eamonn Walker as Chief Wallace Boden
 Annie Ilonzeh as Paramedic Emily Foster
 Nick Gehlfuss as Dr. Will Halstead
 Brian Tee as LCDR Dr. Ethan Choi
 S. Epatha Merkerson as Sharon Goodwin

Episodes

Production

Cast changes
On April 19, 2019, NBC announced that Jon Seda would again depart the series at the end of the sixth season due to creative reasons.

Ratings

Home media
The DVD release of season six was released in Region 1 on September 10, 2019.

References

External links

2018 American television seasons
2019 American television seasons
Chicago P.D. (TV series) seasons